Ivan Petrovich Larionov (January 23, 1830 – April 22, 1889) was a Russian composer, writer and folklorist. He is mostly remembered for the famous song "Kalinka", which he wrote in 1860.

Larionov was born to a noble family in Perm, and studied music in Moscow. He died in Saratov in 1889, from stomach cancer.

References

External links

1830 births
1889 deaths
Musicians from Perm, Russia
People from Permsky Uyezd
19th-century composers
19th-century male musicians
Russian composers
Russian folklorists
Russian male composers
Russian male writers
Deaths from stomach cancer
Writers from Perm, Russia